The 1907 University of Utah football team was an American football team that represented the University of Utah as an independent during the 1907 college football season. In its fourth season under head coach Joe Maddock, the team compiled a 4–2 record and outscored all opponents by a total of 78 to 59. The team played its home games at Cummings Field in Salt Lake City.

Schedule

References

University of Utah
Utah Utes football seasons
University of Utah football